The Linwood Street station was a station on the demolished BMT Fulton Street Line in Brooklyn, New York City. It had 2 tracks and 2 side platforms. It was served by trains of the BMT Fulton Street Line. The station was built on February 22, 1892, and served as the eastern terminus of the Fulton Street elevated line for one month. The next stop to the east was Montauk Avenue. The next stop to the west was Van Siclen Avenue. On November 28, 1948, the Independent Subway System opened the underground Shepherd Avenue Subway station two blocks east after years of war-time construction delays. This station rendered both Linwood station and the nearby Montauk Avenue station obsolete, and it closed on April 26, 1956.

References

External links
Linwood Street Elevated Station; BMT Fulton Street Line (NYCSubway.org)

Defunct BMT Fulton Street Line stations
Railway stations in the United States opened in 1892
Railway stations closed in 1956
Former elevated and subway stations in Brooklyn